Events from the year 1547 in Sweden

Incumbents
 Monarch – Gustav I

Events

 - Dissolution of the Black Friars' Monastery of Stockholm.

Births

 - Princess Sophia of Sweden, (died 1611)  
 - Gustaf Banér, privy Councillor (died 1600)

Deaths

References

 
Years of the 16th century in Sweden
Sweden